Goji refers to the fruit of Lycium barbarum and Lycium chinense, two very closely related species of boxthorn in the family Solanaceae.

Goji may also refer to:
 Goji (app), a location-based virtual keyboard for iOS 8
 Goji Electronics, a brand of computer, smartphone, audio products and equipment
 Goji Sakamoto (1944–2018), Japanese politician of the Liberal Democratic Party
 Gouqi jiu, varieties of Chinese alcoholic beverage
 Tappeh Goji, a village in Iran